The Vanuatu cricket team toured Malaysia in September and October 2019 to play a five-match Twenty20 International (T20I) series. All the matches were played at the Kinrara Oval in Kuala Lumpur.

Squads

Tour match

Twenty-over match: Malaysia A vs Vanuatu

T20I series

1st T20I

2nd T20I

3rd T20I

4th T20I

5th T20I

References

External links
 Series home at ESPN Cricinfo

Associate international cricket competitions in 2019–20
Sport in Kuala Lumpur